Craig Dougall McLachlan (born 1 September 1965) is an Australian actor, musician, singer and composer. He has been involved in film, television, the music industry and music theatre for over 30 years. He is best known for appearing in the soap operas Neighbours and Home and Away and the BBC One spy drama Bugs. He has portrayed the title character in The Doctor Blake Mysteries, for which he was nominated for the Logie Award for Most Popular Actor; he has previously won the award in this category three times.

Career

Television
Craig McLachlan first appeared on Australian television in a guest role on The Young Doctors. He was cast as Henry Ramsay, brother of Kylie Minogue's character Charlene, in Channel 10's Neighbours. After appearing in more than 800 episodes and winning the Gold Logie Award for Most Popular Personality on Australian Television (1990) and Silver Logie, he was contracted to Seven Network's Home and Away, playing schoolteacher Grant Mitchell.

Music
A singer, guitarist and songwriter, McLachlan enjoyed international success in a concurrent pop music career. He had hits in Australia and the UK with a remake of the Bo Diddley song "Mona (I Need You Baby)" and with self-penned songs "Amanda", "One Reason Why" and "On My Own". He toured the UK and Europe with his band Check 1–2. At the ARIA Music Awards of 1991, "Mona", won Highest Selling Single for Craig McLachlan & Check 1–2. In the following year his single "On My Own" was one of several works by Simon Hussey, who won Producer of the Year.

Musicals
In 1993 McLachlan starred as Danny Zuko in the West End revival of the musical Grease alongside Deborah Gibson and Sonia Evans. In his stage musical career he starred as Frank-N-Furter in The Rocky Horror Show, Caractacus Pott in Chitty Chitty Bang Bang, Bob Wallace in White Christmas and Billy Flynn in Chicago.

1990s-present
In the mid 1990s McLachlan starred in three seasons of the BBC television series Bugs and appeared in Catherine the Great alongside Catherine Zeta-Jones and Omar Sharif.

Throughout the first decade of the 21st century, McLachlan appeared in around 20 film and television projects, including the American movie Superfire, the television film Heroes' Mountain as Stuart Diver, and Blackjack with Colin Friels. In 2004 he played Michael Chamberlain in Through My Eyes, an account of the Lindy Chamberlain story, and began work in the recurring role of Kane Morgan in McLeod's Daughters. He played Jeff Kennard in the Australian film Hating Alison Ashley, worked alongside Benjamin Bratt and James Franco in The Great Raid, and starred with John Jarratt in Savages Crossing, for which he composed the score.

McLachlan appeared regularly in the Network Seven TV series Packed to the Rafters as ageing rocker Steve Wilson and was cast in the fourth season of Rescue: Special Ops as Hayden Bradley. He played the role of Steve, the handsome gay gardener, in the award-winning production At Home with Julia and appeared in the ABC comedy Lowdown. In 2011 McLachlan had a guest-starring role in an episode of NCIS Los Angeles.

In 2011, British group Rizzle Kicks sampled McLachlan's version of "Mona" for their single "Mama Do the Hump", which peaked at number two on the UK Singles Chart.

McLachlan returned to Australia in 2012 to work on a new TV series, The Doctor Blake Mysteries, a period crime drama set in Ballarat in 1959–60. He plays the titular role of Dr Lucien Blake, a medical practitioner with a knack for solving murders and annoying the police. The first two seasons originally screened on ABC Television in 2013 and 2014.

In 2013, McLachlan was again cast as Frank-N-Furter in a revival of The Rocky Horror Show touring Australia in 2014. In December 2014, McLachlan revealed that he was unable to return to Neighbours for the show's 30th anniversary celebrations owing to scheduling conflicts and his involvement in The Doctor Blake Mysteries. However, McLachlan agreed to take part in the documentary special Neighbours 30th: The Stars Reunite, which aired in Australia and the UK in March 2015.

In 2016, McLachlan appeared in the sci-fi thriller Restoration, playing Andrew Majury.

McLachlan also had a recurring role in the Channel 10 dramedy The Wrong Girl alongside Jessica Marais.

Sexual harassment allegations

During The Rocky Horror Show 
On 8 January 2018, a joint investigation by Fairfax Media and the Australian Broadcasting Corporation (ABC) reported that McLachlan had been accused of sexual harassment by several actresses during his performing career. Three actresses from the 2014 Australian production of The Rocky Horror Show — Christie Whelan Browne, Erika Heynatz and Angela Scundi — made allegations against McLachlan. He responded, "Frankly, they seem to be simple inventions, perhaps made for financial reasons, perhaps to gain notoriety. In either event, they are to the best of my knowledge utterly and entirely false." McLachlan subsequently left the 2018 production of The Rocky Horror Show. Victoria Police announced they were investigating complaints from two of the women.

McLachlan filed defamation suits against the ABC and Fairfax Media in February 2018; he also named Whelan Browne in a defamation suit. Producers of The Doctor Blake Mysteries announced that production would be temporarily suspended pending the outcome of investigations. The production company, December Media, "cleared the actor of any misconduct" during the show's run. In April, it was announced McLachlan would not be returning to the series.

McLachlan's defamation case was due to be heard in the Supreme Court of New South Wales from 4 February 2019; however, the suit was postponed pending the outcome of the related criminal proceedings. On 11 January 2019, Victoria Police charged him with one count of common assault, eight counts of indecent assault and one count of attempted indecent assault. At a hearing in April 2019 it came to light that one of the indecent assault charges had been dropped and that the case would be determined by a magistrate alone. In November 2019, a contested hearing of the charges began, with Stuart Littlemore as defence lawyer. The trial ended on 15 December 2020 with McLachlan acquitted on all charges. 

The magistrate described McLachlan's evidence as contrived and his emotions as "not seeming genuine", also characterising the women who gave evidence as "brave and honest witnesses". The magistrate also said that McLachlan likely touched the women while they were performing, but that she [the magistrate] was not persuaded beyond a reasonable doubt he knew they were not consenting. During the course of the trial, McLachlan's lawyers argued "there was an overtly sexualised atmosphere among all cast members during the show that included crude physical pranks, hugs and kisses instead of saying hello and goodbye, actors sitting on each other's laps, a constant stream of dirty jokes and insincere remarks about their admiration and love for each other".

In May 2021, Seven News' Spotlight programme claimed that the ABC had "manipulated" McLachlan's accusers when it interviewed the women in 2018. The programme showed ABC journalists (off camera) appearing to coach the accusers by offering specific words and phases for them to say in their interview, such as "predatory" and "power imbalance". The ABC rejected those claims. McLachlan filed a law suit against the ABC and Nine newspapers over media reports of the 2014 Rocky Horror Show tour allegations for which he was tried and acquitted. However, he applied to discontinue the suit 10 days into the trial, on the same day the defence was set to begin calling witnesses.

Further allegations
On 15 May 2021, fresh allegations were made about the actor's behaviour, including from Jeanne Downs, a former UK television star who accused the actor of groping her live while a guest on her popular children's show in 1990.

Personal life
McLachlan's partner is opera conductor Vanessa Scammell, whom he met in 2009. He has a child from his relationship with British actress and voice artist Charlotte Avery. McLachlan was briefly married to Karen Williams with whom he had attended the same secondary school, and he was subsequently married to Neighbours actress Rachel Friend (1998–99).

Discography

Studio albums

Musical albums

Singles

Videos
Craig McLachlan & Check 1–2: The Video (featured an interview and the video clips for "Mona", "Amanda", "Rock the Rock" and "I Almost Felt Like Crying") (1990)

Filmography

Film

Television

Awards and nominations

References

External links
 

1965 births
ARIA Award winners
Australian male film actors
Australian pop singers
Australian rock singers
Australian male stage actors
Australian male television actors
Gold Logie winners
Helpmann Award winners
Living people
People acquitted of sex crimes
Male actors from Sydney
20th-century Australian male actors
20th-century Australian male singers
21st-century Australian male actors
CBS Records artists
Musicians from Sydney